The 2014–15 2. Bundesliga was the 41st season of the 2. Bundesliga, Germany's second-level football competition.

Teams

A total of 18 teams contest the league, including 12 sides from the 2013–14 season, two sides directly relegated from the 2013–14 Bundesliga season, and two sides directly promoted from the 2013–14 3. Liga season. The two final participants were determined in two-legged play-offs, in which the 16th placed Bundesliga side  played the team who finished third in 2. Bundesliga and the 16th 2. Bundesliga side  played the team who finished third in the 3. Liga.

2014–15 Teams

 1. FC Nürnberg (relegated from 2013–14 Bundesliga)
 Eintracht Braunschweig (relegated from 2013–14 Bundesliga)
 1. FC Kaiserslautern
 Karlsruher SC
 Fortuna Düsseldorf
 1860 Munich
 FC St. Pauli
 VfR Aalen
 SV Sandhausen
 1. FC Union Berlin
 FC Ingolstadt 04
 Erzgebirge Aue
 FSV Frankfurt
 Greuther Fürth
 VfL Bochum
 1. FC Heidenheim (2013–14 3. Liga champion)
 RB Leipzig (2013–14 3. Liga runner-up)
 SV Darmstadt 98 (2013–14 2. Bundesliga Play-off Winner)

Stadiums and locations

 The capacity was reduced from the end of October 2014 until the end of the season due to the demolition and redevelopment of the North stand.

Personnel and sponsorships

Managerial changes

League table

Results

Promotion play-offs

Relegation play-offs
The team which finished 16th faced the third-placed 2014–15 3. Liga side for a two-legged play-off. The winner on aggregate score after both matches earned entry into the 2015–16 2. Bundesliga.

First leg

Second leg

1860 Munich won 2–1 on aggregate.

Season statistics

Top scorers
As of 24 May 2015

Top assists
As of 24 May 2015

References

2014–15 in German football leagues
2014-15
Ger